Pimcore is an open-source enterprise PHP software platform for product information management (PIM), master data management (MDM), customer data management (CDP), digital asset management (DAM), content management (CMS), and digital commerce.

Technology 
Pimcore is operated in the web browser and is based on the PHP programming language, as well as the MySQL/MariaDB database system. It consists of a modular software architecture that uses leading development frameworks, such as the Symfony project and the package management Composer based on a "best-of-breed" approach. The architecture uses the conventions of object-oriented software development, taking into account the MVC (Model View Controller) design pattern.

Pimcore follows the specifications and definitions of the PHP Framework Interop Group (PSR 1, 2, 3, 4 and 7). The company has been a member of this PHP standardization body since August 2016.

Since its initial release in 2010, Pimcore has followed a fully API-based approach. All functionalities can be accessed by a PHP and a REST API. This allows for easy connectivity to any existing third-party systems, such as SAP, Navision, Salesforce or Oracle. The core of Pimcore is extensible through third-party components and plugins.

Pimcore has a management interface to configure the system and manage data. The user interface is based on the Sencha Ext-JS-6 development framework.

Functionality 
Pimcore's portfolio consists of open source software solutions for multi-domain master data management and solutions for cross-channel digital commerce and content management. In addition to a free community edition, the software solution is also available as an enterprise edition. The software platform includes functionalities for product information management (PIM), web content management (CMS), digital asset management (DAM) and e-commerce and is available under the open source GPLv3 license and the proprietary PEL (Pimcore Enterprise License). Pimcore is now (December 2022) deployed more than 100,000 times worldwide in 174 different countries and has been translated into 20 different languages.

Master Data Management (MDM) / Product Information Management (PIM) 
Pimcore's MDM/PIM functionalities deal with the lifecycle of a company's master and product data. The focus is on the consolidation of data, the creation of a central data repository and data quality management topics. In this context, Pimcore enables the configuration of data models of any complexity and the consolidation of data for companies from a wide range of industries and with a wide range of business models. Pimcore includes more than 40 data components and is compatible with classification systems such as eCl@ss and GS1. Content as well as structures, versions, descriptions, translations can be managed centrally.

Web Content Management (CMS) 
CMS functionalities are based on the media-neutral management of data and the support of the single-source and multi-channel publishing principle. Pimcore can therefore be used to create and manage cross-media and cross-channel content that can be consumed on digital devices (desktop, mobile, tablet) as well as offline at POS and in print.

Digitales Asset Management (DAM) 
DAM functionalities include centralized management, classification and conversion of digital media in any format and size. The objective is to simplify the management of media and deliver the right media in the appropriate formats to the relevant output channels.

E-Commerce-Framework 
The e-commerce framework is a component-based development framework to rapidly develop flexible B2B and B2C e-commerce applications.

Customer Data Framework 
The Customer Data Framework is a component-based development framework to rapidly develop applications for customer data management, customer data segmentation, personalization and marketing automation.

Pimcore Platform 
The Pimcore platform combines PIM, CMS, DAM and e-commerce in a single open source application, positioning itself as a system solution for consolidating IT landscapes. In this sense, Pimcore is a champion for integrated system solutions, rather than the best-of-breed approach.

History
Pimcore was originally developed by the digital agency elements.at New Media Solutions GmbH. The first public beta version was released on January 21, 2010. In 2013, the company Pimcore GmbH was founded.

In 2015, Pimcore launched a global partnership program for system integrators and digital agencies. It has partners in Europe, North America, and Southeast Asia.

Pimcore follows the guidelines and definitions of the PHP Framework Interop Group (PSR 1, 2, 3, 4 and 7). The company has been a member of this PHP standardization body since August 2016.

In 2018, Pimcore received $3.5 million in Series A funding by German Auctus Capital.

In 2022, Pimcore closed a $12M Series B Deal led by Nordwind Growth to globally expand the Enterprise Open-Source Data and Experience Management Platform.

Technology
Pimcore is a web-based application and uses the PHP programming language and the MySQL/MariaDB relational database management system. The core application is extensible through plugins, and by utilizing APIs. Pimcore includes an administrative back-end interface for system configuration and managing data. It makes use of the following components:
Symfony, a web application framework
PHPUnit, a unit testing framework
Twig, a templating engine
Swift Mailer, an e-mail library
Composer, a package manager
Ext JS, a JavaScript single-page application framework

Usage

Northgate Markets, developed an end-to-end ordering system an overhauled its website with Pimcore
Alshaya, a Kuwait-based international franchise operator, implemented a PIM and DAM to manage data for 1.8 million products
Open Icecat added an open source plugin to upload the open content database to a Pimcore instance

Awards and recognition
 2010: Winner of the "Most Promising Open Source Project 2010" 
 2013: Winner of the Austrian Multimedia and E-Business State Award
 2016: Frost & Sullivan Content Management Systems Technology Innovation Award
 2017: CMS Critic Award in Category "Best Enterprise CMS"
 2018: Gartner "Cool Vendor in Digital Commerce"
 2019: 15 leading product information management systems
 2020: A Market Leader in the Master Data Management Software Category in Customer Success Report
 2021: Gartner "Customer´s Choice"
 2021: Exemplary Vendor at Ventana Research PIM Value Index
 2022: Gartner "Customer´s Choice"
 2022: Gartner "Strong Performer in Digital Commerce"

References

Content management systems
Free content management systems
Free software programmed in PHP
Free e-commerce software
Extract, transform, load tools
Data quality companies
Data companies